Dolichurus is a genus of cockroach wasps in the family Ampulicidae; they are generally found on dead wood, leaf litter, or on tree trunks. There are at least 50 described species in Dolichurus.

These wasps are small in size with an elongate body and slender appendages; legs are modified for running. Sexual dimorphism is not marked; antennae have 12 segments in females and 13 segments in males; females have six visible metasomal segments and males usually have only three visible segments. In females metasomal punctures are usually fine, almost impunctate with very sparse delicate punctures (surface glossy) but the metasomal punctures of males are usually coarser.

This is a cosmopolitan genus with about 50 species worldwide (Nearctic 1, Neotropical 2, Palearctic 6, Ethiopian 10, Oriental 27, and Australian 4).

Latreille (1809) erected the genus Dolichurus (Hymenoptera: Ampulicidae) based on the type species Pompilus corniculus Spinola, 1808.

Species
These 50 species belong to the genus Dolichurus:

 Dolichurus abbreviatus Strand, 1913
 Dolichurus abdominalis F. Smith, 1860
 Dolichurus albifacies Krombein, 1979
 Dolichurus alorus Nagy, 1971
 Dolichurus amamiensis Tsuneki & Iida, 1964
 Dolichurus apiciornatus Tsuneki, 1977
 Dolichurus aposanus Tsuneki in Tsuneki et al., 1992
 Dolichurus aridulus Krombein, 1979
 Dolichurus astos Ohl, 2002
 Dolichurus baguionis Tsuneki in Tsuneki et al., 1992
 Dolichurus basuto Arnold, 1952
 Dolichurus bicolor Lepeletier de Saint Fargeau, 1845
 Dolichurus bimaculatus Arnold, 1928
 Dolichurus carbonarius F. Smith, 1869
 Dolichurus cearensis Ducke, 1910
 Dolichurus clypealis Tsuneki in Tsuneki et al., 1992
 Dolichurus corniculus (Spinola, 1808)
 Dolichurus crenatus Ohl, 2002
 Dolichurus dromedarius Nagy, 1971
 Dolichurus formosanus Tsuneki, 1967
 Dolichurus foroforo Ohl, Fritz & Neumann, 2004
 Dolichurus gilberti R. Turner, 1912
 Dolichurus greenei Rohwer, 1916
 Dolichurus guillarmodi Arnold, 1952
 Dolichurus haemorrhous A. Costa, 1886
 Dolichurus ignitus F. Smith, 1869
 Dolichurus kohli Arnold, 1928
 Dolichurus laevis F. Smith, 1873
 Dolichurus lankensis Krombein, 1979
 Dolichurus leioceps Strand, 1913
 Dolichurus maculicollis Tsuneki, 1967
 Dolichurus major Kazenas, 1976
 Dolichurus mindanaonis Tsuneki in Tsuneki et al., 1992
 Dolichurus ombrodes Nagy, 1971
 Dolichurus oxanus Nagy, 1971
 Dolichurus palawanensis Tsuneki in Tsuneki et al., 1992
 Dolichurus pempuchiensis Tsuneki, 1972
 Dolichurus pigmaeus Tsuneki, 1976
 Dolichurus quadridentatus Arnold, 1940
 Dolichurus rubripyx Arnold, 1928
 Dolichurus rugosifrons Tsuneki in Tsuneki et al., 1992
 Dolichurus secundus de Saussure, 1892
 Dolichurus shirozui Tsuneki, 1967
 Dolichurus silvicola Krombein, 1979
 Dolichurus stantoni (Ashmead, 1904)
 Dolichurus taprobanae F. Smith, 1869
 Dolichurus turanicus Gussakovskij, 1952
 Dolichurus venator Arnold, 1928
 Dolichurus yungaburra Ohl, 2002
 † Dolichurus heevansi Ohl, 2004

References

Parasitic wasps
Articles created by Qbugbot